Kupatadze is a Georgian surname. Notable people with the surname include:
Konstantine Kupatadze (born 1983), Georgian boxer
Lazare Kupatadze (born 1996), Georgian footballer
Zviad Kupatadze (born 1979), Georgian futsal player

Surnames of Georgian origin
Georgian-language surnames